= Ferdinand V =

Ferdinand V is the name of:

- Ferdinand II of Aragon, Ferdinand V of Castile, the Catholic king of Castile, Aragon and Naples
- Ferdinand I of Austria, Ferdinand V of Hungary and Bohemia.
